Jun Takaku (born May 12, 1984)  is a Japanese basketball player who played for Link Tochigi Brex and Japan national 3x3 team. He played college basketball for Hosei University.

Career statistics 

|-
| align="left" |  2008-09
| align="left" | Tochigi
| 6 ||  || 3.2 || .429 || .000 || .000 || 0.7 || 0.0 || 0.2 || 0.0 ||  1.0
|-

References

1984 births
Living people
Japanese men's basketball players
Japan national 3x3 basketball team players
Utsunomiya Brex players
Basketball players from Tokyo
Forwards (basketball)